Galomecalpa minutuncus is a species of moth of the family Tortricidae. It is found in Zamora-Chinchipe Province, Ecuador.

The wingspan is 18 mm. The ground colour of the forewings is pale ferruginous, but whitish along markings and brownish rust along the termen and partly along the costa. The hindwings are brownish cream, but cream at the base.

Etymology
The species name refers to the size of the uncus and is derived from Latin minutus (meaning small).

References

Moths described in 2008
Euliini
Moths of South America
Taxa named by Józef Razowski